Altyn (Russian , also  altýnnik) is a historical Russian currency. The name in Tatar is altı meaning "six", since it was worth 6 dengas, equivalent to three kopeck silver, then copper, a small value coin, or 180–206 copper puls. 

From the 15th century, altyn had been in use in several Russian principalities as a Eurasian currency between Russian and Asian traders. They were minted from 1654 under Alexis I, under Peter I as silver coins from 1704 to 1718. Later they were revived under Nicholas I as copper coins with a value of three kopecks from 1839. While the name altyn eventually got lost, three-kopeck-coins circulated in Russia until 1991.

In the 2010s, the Eurasian Economic Commission drafted first proposals to revive the altyn once again by 2025 as a common currency of the Eurasian Economic Union, although western sanctions against Russia reportedly encouraged the bloc to expedite the process by 3-5 years. However, as of 2023 the currency had still not been re-introduced.

References

Literature 
Узденников В. Монеты России (1700—1917): Издание третье. — М.: Collector’s Books; IP Media Inc., 2004.

Modern obsolete currencies
Proposed currencies
Coins of Russia